The 1927–28 season was Galatasaray SK's 24th in existence. The Istanbul Football League was aborted due to 1928 Summer Olympics, which were held in Amsterdam.

Squad statistics

İstanbul Ligi
Only two matches were played. 
Kick-off listed in local time (EET)

Amatör Futbol Şampiyonası

Friendly Matches
Kick-off listed in local time (EEST)

Turkish Football Republic Cup

References
 Futbol vol.2, Galatasaray. Tercüman Spor Ansiklopedisi.(1981) (page 561)
 1927-1928 İstanbul Futbol Ligi. Türk Futbol Tarihi vol.1. page(47). (June 1992) Türkiye Futbol Federasyonu Yayınları.
 Atabeyoğlu, Cem. 1453-1991 Türk Spor Tarihi Ansiklopedisi. page(101-102, 104, 148).(1991) An Grafik Basın Sanayi ve Ticaret AŞ
 Tekil, Süleyman. Dünden bugüne Galatasaray(1983). Page(176). Arset Matbaacılık Kol.Şti.

External links
 Galatasaray Sports Club Official Website 
 Turkish Football Federation - Galatasaray A.Ş. 
 uefa.com - Galatasaray AŞ

Galatasaray S.K. (football) seasons
Turkish football clubs 1927–28 season
1920s in Istanbul